Muhammad Aizat bin Amdan (born 21 January 1989) or commercially known as Aizat Amdan, or Ai.Z, is a Malaysian singer-songwriter.

Aizat began his music career as a contestant in the 5th season of Malaysian reality TV singing contest Akademi Fantasia A while after the contest ended, Aizat surprised the Malaysian public and his fans with his new look, managing to lose 30 kg from a previous 112 kg.

Aizat is well known for inducing creative sounds and lyrical prose within his songs. He describes his music as a mixture of pop rock and alternative music influenced by Britpop.

In 2007, Aizat released two of his singles entitled "Hanya Kau Yang Mampu" and "Sahabat". "Hanya Kau Yang Mampu" was a major hit in Malaysia earning it the title of the Most Downloaded song in 2009 at Anugerah Planet Muzik. Since then Aizat has released two albums Percubaan Pertama and Urusan Aizat Amdan.

Background
Aizat has been writing and singing since he was 12 years old when he first learned to play the guitar alongside his brother Anas. He played at school gigs and performed at school level competitions. He wrote the song "Lagu Kita" when he was in Form 3, which subsequently featured in Aizat's 1st album Percubaan Pertama.

Career

2007: Akademi Fantasia and early career 
Upon graduating from high school, Aizat auditioned for Akademi Fantasia (or AF as it is commonly known) and was accepted as one of the final 12 contestants. His rendition of Anuar Zain's "Perpisahan" was thought to be one of the best performance of the competition. His performance of the song "Hanya Kau Yang Mampu" reached the top of local music charts. Aizat finished 7th place. His brother Amar opened the Tifo Arena with Remy in 2015.

On 7 July 2007, Aizat and his family incorporated his own production label, Kasi Gegar Entertainment Sdn Bhd (KGE). From there he has launched two albums through this label and he has organised several concerts throughout Peninsular Malaysia and Borneo.

2021: Rebrand as Ai.Z 
In 2021, Aizat rebranded and took on the stage name Ai.Z in an effort to break into the international market. His debut song, as Ai.Z, "The Last Thing", was written in collaboration with fellow Malaysian pop star, Yuna, and was released under her label, Yuna Room Records.

Personal life 
Aizat married his manager, Elyssa Alia Ilias, on 14 August 2022 in Puchong, Selangor. The single "Hanya Kita Dua" was dedicated to Elyssa as a pre-wedding gift.

Discography

Studio album(s)

EP(s) 

 Legasi (2014)
 Live at the Theatre (2019)

Singles

As lead artist

As featured artist

Other songs

Filmography

Film

Awards

References

Citations

Sources

External links
 Aizat's official site
 Aizat's official Youtube account
 Aizat's official Facebook page
 Aizat's official Twitter page

1989 births
Living people
Malaysian people of Malay descent
Malaysian male pop singers
Malaysian Muslims
People from Kuala Lumpur
Malay-language singers
Akademi Fantasia participants
Malaysian pop rock singers
21st-century Malaysian male singers